This is a list of the counts of Arles.

Garin, or Warin, (until 853), also Guerin in French, Garí in Spanish, and Guerí in Catalan; also duke of Toulouse (835–840), margrave of Burgundy, and count of Autun, Mâcon, Chalon, Mementois, and Auxois
Isembard, Count of Autun (853–858), also count of Mâcon, Chalon, Dijon, Empúries, Rosselló, and Barcelona
Gerard (858–868)
Boso I (868–879), also count of Bourges and Vienne (871–879), king of Provence (879–887)
Theobald  (879–895)
Boso, (895–911), also margrave of Tuscany (931–936)
Hugh (911–923), son of Theobald, also King of Italy (924–947)
Rotbold I (923–928), also Rotbaud or Roubaud in French and Catalan
Rotbold II (928–948), also Rotbaud or Roubaud in French and Catalan
Boso II (948–965)
William I of Provence (968–)

To Provence (see Counts of Provence), where Boso's son, Rotbold II of Provence is named first count.

 
Arles